Caroline Hodgson (1851 – 11 July 1908), also known as Madame Brussels, was a well-known brothel proprietor and local identity of the Little Lon district in Melbourne, Victoria, Australia, during the late 19th century.

Life
Hodgson was born in Potsdam, Prussia; a daughter of John and Frederica Lohman or Lohmar. She married the well connected Studholme George Hodgson in London on 18 February 1871 and the couple immediately migrated to Australia, arriving in Melbourne on the ship Melmerby on 24 June 1871. In November 1872, Studholme joined the Victoria Police and was placed in country Mansfield, leaving his 25-year-old wife alone in Melbourne.

By the end of 1874, Caroline, using the name 'Madame Brussels', was running a number of brothels, an occupation she continued successfully until 1907. When her husband became ill with tuberculosis in late 1892, Hodgson arranged for him to be nursed in at "Gnarwin", a property she owned on Beaconsfield Parade, St Kilda. He died in 1893. Memorial notices she placed as 'his loving wife Caroline Hodgson' made mention that he was 'brother-in-law of the baronet Sir Francis Wood, the brother of Sir Evelyn Wood'.

In 1895, Hodgson married German engineer Jacob Pohl, who was at least 15 years her junior. However, Pohl suddenly disappeared to South Africa while they were on a trip to visit relatives in Germany in 1896. There was a reconciliation in 1898, but a divorce was granted in February 1907 'on the grounds of desertion'. In court 'she appeared as a most benevolent looking old lady, and quite secured the sympathy of the court by her demeanor and recital of the story of her wrongs'.

Hodgson died the following year at her Lonsdale Street home suffering from diabetes and chronic pancreatitis. She was buried at St Kilda Cemetery beside her first husband. She was survived by an adopted daughter, Irene

Career as a brothel keeper

The reason for Hodgson's decision to turn to brothel keeping in 1874 is unknown, but historian Leanne Robinson suggests women had relatively few options open to them as a means to survive the economic uncertainty of life alone in the colony. Domestic service was poorly paid, as were the few occupations open to women – such as dressmaking and teaching. Hodgson's establishment of brothels in the Little Lon district, suggests she received financial backing from "friends in high places", a charge also made by Melbourne's Truth newspaper during their long campaign against her. Justin McCarthy also suggests the elite sex industry offered an attractive financial and social independence for women.

Hodgson's principal establishment, which was also her home, was located at 32-34 Lonsdale Street, Melbourne, not far from Parliament House. The building was extravagantly furnished and catered to Victoria's commercial, political and judicial ruling class, acting much as a gentlemen's club.

Madame Brussels was 'used as a political football in 1906' and, the following year, was forced to close her businesses after the introduction of the Police Offences Act and increased efforts by the government to curtail prostitution.

Campaign against her and end of career
In the late 19th century Hodgson became the target of increasing vilification from newspapers and public figures. In his 1891 pamphlet The War between Heaven and Hell, religious crusader Henry Varley singled out Madame Brussels for particular scorn, describing her as an "accursed procuress", who was protected by the city's magistrates. In one famous passage, he claimed she had toured the streets of Melbourne "in charge of a beautiful young girl under twenty, with a white feather in her hat, telling by advertisement (the white feather) that maiden virtue was to be had for a price in her gilded den"

Madame Brussels is also associated with the disappearance of the Victorian Parliamentary mace in 1892. Rumours suggest politicians took the valuable object to one of her brothels 'where Members used it for "unparliamentary activities"'. Another theory has the mace disappearing at a brothel owned by her 'chief rival' Annie Wilson.

John Norton's Truth newspaper also regularly attacked her, reporting in detail any of her court appearances. For example, in March 1906, the paper ran the headline "Madame Brussels' Notorious Bawdy House: Her Junketing Jezebels", above drawings of her "flash" girls. A wealthy grazier had called the police after his watch and sovereign purse were stolen in the brothel. Later that year, in a major exposé, the paper detailed Sir Samuel Gillott's many years of financial dealings with Hodgson. As Leanne Robinson notes, although Gillott "freely acknowledged his role as Caroline's mortgagee, he claimed ignorance as to the nature of [her] business – despite the fact that, as a parliamentarian, he'd been instrumental in framing legislation against gambling and licensing and had chaired public meetings on the suppression of vice." Within a week, Gillott had resigned and soon after returned to England, and Hodgson had lost a significant ally.

In April 1907, after appearing in court charged under new laws with "owing and operating a disorderly house", the ailing Caroline Hodgson closed her brothels in Lonsdale Street. With failing eyesight, diabetes and chronic pancreatitis, she continued to live at her Lonsdale Street property until her death in July 1908.

Legacy
Hodgson's former brothels at numbers 6-8 and 32-36 Lonsdale Street were demolished to make way for factories sometime before 1914. These factories were, in turn, demolished to make way for the Commonwealth building in the 1990s. Major archaeological investigations were conducted in the "Little Lon" block in 1988-9 and 2003, but they did not include the site of Hodgson's former properties. The studies did, however, establish prostitution as one of the key activities of this area in the late nineteenth century. All of the artefacts recovered during these digs are held by the Melbourne Museum.

Several buildings still remain that were contemporary with Madam Brussel's era. These include the former Black Eagle Hotel (built 1854) at number 42-44 Lonsdale Street and the worker's cottage at Number 17 Casselden Place (built 1877).

Caroline Hodgson's former seaside property in St. Kilda still stands. A city laneway has been named after her, and a Melbourne bar also bears her name.

See also
 Sarah Fraser

References

External links
Museum Victoria's website on "Little Lon" – wayback machine

1851 births
1908 deaths
Australian brothel owners and madams
German emigrants to Australia
People from Melbourne
People from Potsdam
19th-century Australian businesspeople
19th-century Australian women
20th-century Australian women